Mamakan is an urban locality (an urban-type settlement) in Bodaybinsky District of Irkutsk Oblast, Russia. Population: 

Mamakan is the capital of the Mamakan Urban Settlement (Мамаканское городское поселение) municipal unit, which includes only the Mamakan urban locality.

Geography 
The Mamakan, one of its main tributaries, flows into the Vitim near the settlement.

Climate

Notable people
 Fyodor Kudryashov (1987) - Russian footballer

References

Urban-type settlements in Irkutsk Oblast